Cinfuegos is one of thirteen parishes (administrative divisions) in Quirós, a municipality within the province and autonomous community of the Principality of Asturias, in northern Spain. The population is 81 (2010).

Villages
 Cinfuegos - Pop. 22
 Cuevas - Pop. 3
 El Molín - Pop. 19
 Las Chanas - Pop. 0
 Viḷḷar de Cinfuegos - Pop. 37

References

 Populations data by INE

Parishes in Quirós